Banglades can refer to:

 Bangladesh, country in South Asia
 Bangladeš, suburban settlement near Novi Sad, Serbia